The Temple of Hercules Pompeianus (Latin: aedes Herculis Pompeiani) was a temple dedicated to Hercules in ancient Rome near the circus Maximus. Vitruvius (III.3.5) refers to it being decorated in the Tuscan manner. It contained a statue of Hercules by Myron. 'Pompeianus' may indicate either that it was an older building built by the Pompeius family or that it was restored by Pompey the Great. It seems to be linked to Republican-era tufa foundations discovered under Santa Maria in Cosmedin.

See also
List of Ancient Roman temples

References

Bibliography
Platner and Ashby, A Topographical Dictionary of Ancient Rome, 1929, p. 255-256
Burgess, The topography and antiquities of Rome, p 141

Hercules Pompeianus
Temples of Heracles

Destroyed temples